These are the results of the Women's 100 metres hurdles event at the 1995 World Championships in Athletics in Gothenburg, Sweden.

Medalists

Results

Heats
First 2 of each heat (Q) and the next 6 fastest (q) qualified for the semifinals.

Wind:Heat 1: -0.2 m/s, Heat 2: -0.6 m/s, Heat 3: ? m/s, Heat 4: -0.2 m/s, Heat 5: -1.0 m/s

Semifinals
First 4 of each heat (Q) qualified directly for the final.

Wind:Heat 1: +0.1 m/s, Heat 2: -0.3 m/s

Final
Wind: +0.2 m/s

References
 Results
 IAAF

- Women's 100 Metres Hurdles
Sprint hurdles at the World Athletics Championships
1995 in women's athletics